Maplewood High School may mean:
Maplewood High School (Ohio) in Cortland, Ohio, USA
Maplewood High School (Toronto) in Scarborough, Ontario, M1E 1W7, Canada
Maplewood Comprehensive High School in Nashville, Tennessee, USA
Maplewood Richmond Heights High School in Maplewood, Missouri, USA